This is a list of dragonflies (Odonata) of Canada.

Family Aeshnidae, darners

Genus Aeshna
 Aeshna canadensis, Canada darner
 Aeshna clepsydra, mottled darner
 Aeshna constricta, lance-tipped darner
 Aeshna eremita, lake darner
 Aeshna interrupta, variable darner
 Aeshna juncea, common hawker
 Aeshna mixta, migrant hawker
 Aeshna palmata, paddle-tailed darner
 Aeshna septentrionalis, azure darner
 Aeshna sitchensis, zigzag darner
 Aeshna subarctica, subarctic darner
 Aeshna tuberculifera, black-tipped darner
 Aeshna umbrosa, shadow darner
 Aeshna verticalis, green-striped darner

Genus Anax
 Anax imperator, Emperor
 Anax junius, green darner
 Anax longipes, comet darner

Genus Basiaeschna
 Basiaeschna janata, springtime darner

Genus Boyeria
 Boyeria grafiana, ocellated darner
 Boyeria vinosa, fawn darner

Genus Epiaeschna
 Epiaeschna heros, swamp darner

Genus Gomphaeschna
 Gomphaeschna furcillata, harlequin darner

Genus Nasiaeschna
 Nasiaechna pentacantha, Cyrano darner

Genus Rhionaeschna
 Rhionaeschna californica, California darner
 Rhionaeschna mutata, spatterdock darner
 Rhionaeschna multicolor, blue-eyed darner

Family Gomphidae, clubtails

Genus Hagenius
Hagenius brevistylus, dragonhunter

Genus Hylogomphus
Hylogomphus adelphus, mustached clubtail
Hylogomphus viridifrons, green-faced clubtail

Genus Gomphurus
 Gomphurus externus, plains clubtail
 Gomphurus fraternus, midland clubtail
 Gomphurus lineatifrons, splendid clubtail
 Gomphurus vastus, cobra clubtail
 Gomphurus ventricosus, skillet clubtail

Genus Stylurus
Stylurus amnicola, riverine clubtail
Stylurus intricatus, brimstone clubtail
Stylurus notatus, elusive clubtail
Stylurus olivaceus, olive clubtail
Stylurus scudderi, zebra clubtail
Stylurus spiniceps, arrow clubtail

Genus Dromogomphus
Dromogomphus spinosus, black-shouldered clubtail
Dromogomphus spoliatus, flag-tailed clubtail

Genus Arigomphus

Arigomphus cornutus, horned clubtail
Arigomphus furcifer, lilypad clubtail
Arigomphus villosipes, unicorn clubtail

Genus Phanogomphus
 Phanogomphus borealis, beaverpond clubtail
 Phanogomphus descriptus, harpoon clubtail
 Phanogomphus exilis, lancet clubtail
 Phanogomphus graslinellus, pronghorn clubtail
 Phanogomphus lividus, ashy clubtail
 Phanogomphus spicatus, dusky clubtail
 Phanogomphus quadricolor, rapids clubtail

Genus Progomphus
Progomphus obscurus, common sanddragon

Genus Ophiogomphus
Ophiogomphus anomalus, extra-striped snaketail
Ophiogomphus aspersus, brook snaketail
Ophiogomphus carolus, riffle snaketail
Ophiogomphus colubrinus, boreal snaketail
Ophiogomphus howei, pygmy snaketail
Ophiogomphus mainensis, Maine snaketail
Ophiogomphus occidentis, sinuous snaketail
Ophiogomphus severus, pale snaketail
Ophiogomphus smithi, Sioux snaketail
Ophiogomphus rupinsulensis, rusty snaketail

Genus Stylogomphus
Stylogomphus albistylus, least clubtail

Genus Lanthus
Lanthus parvulus, northern pygmy clubtail

Genus Octogomphus
Octogomphus specularis, grappletail

Family Cordulegastridae, spiketails

Genus Cordulegaster
Cordulegaster diastatops, delta-spotted Spiketail
Cordulegaster dorsalis, Pacific spiketail
Cordulegaster maculata, twin-spotted spiketail
Cordulegaster obliqua, arrowhead spiketail

Family Corduliidae, emeralds

Genus Cordulia
 Cordulia shurtleffii, American emerald

Genus Dorocordulia

 Dorocordulia libera, racket-tailed emerald
 Dorocordulia lepida, petite emerald

Genus Helocordulia
 Helocordulia uhleri, Uhler's sundragon

Genus Williamsonia
 Williamsonia fletcheri, ebony boghaunter

Genus Epitheca
 Epitheca princeps, prince baskettail
 Epitheca cynosura, common baskettail

Genus Somatochlora
 Somatochlora albicincta, ringed emerald
 Somatochlora brevicincta, Quebec emerald
 Somatochlora cingulata, lake emerald
 Somatochlora elongata, ski-tailed emerald
 Somatochlora ensigera, plains emerald
 Somatochlora forcipata, forcipate emerald
 Somatochlora franklini, delicate emerald
 Somatochlora hineana, Hine's emerald
 Somatochlora hudsonica, Hudsonian emerald
 Somatochlora incurvata, incurvate emerald
 Somatochlora kennedyi, Kennedy's emerald
 Somatochlora minor, ocellated emerald
 Somatochlora sahlbergi, treeline emerald
 Somatochlora semicircularis, mountain emerald
 Somatochlora septentrionalis, muskeg emerald
 Somatochlora tenebrosa, clamp-tipped emerald
 Somatochlora walshii, brush-tipped emerald
 Somatochlora williamsoni, Williamson's emerald
 Somatochlora whitehousei, Whitehouse's emerald

Genus Neurocordulia
 Neurocordulia yamaskanensis, Stygian shadowdragon

Family Libellulidae, skimmers, chasers

Genus Libellula
 Libellula depressa, broad-bodied chaser
 Libellula forensis, eight-spotted skimmer
 Libellula fulva, scarce chaser
 Libellula incesta, slaty skimmer
 Libellula julia, chalk-fronted corporal
 Libellula luctuosa, widow skimmer
 Libellula lydia, common whitetail
 Libellula pulchella, twelve-spotted skimmer
 Libellula quadrimaculata, four-spotted chaser

Genus Sympetrum
 Sympetrum corruptum, variegated meadowhawk
 Sympetrum costiferum, saffron-winged meadowhawk
 Sympetrum danae, black meadowhawk
 Sympetrum illotum, cardinal meadowhawk
 Sympetrum internum, cherry-faced meadowhawk
 Sympetrum flaveolum, yellow-winged darter
 Sympetrum fonscolombii, red-veined darter
 Sympetrum obtrusum, white-faced meadowhawk
 Sympetrum pallipes, striped meadowhawk
 Sympetrum madidum, red-veined meadowhawk
 Sympetrum rubicundulum, ruby meadowhawk
 Sympetrum semicinctum, band-winged meadowhawk
 Sympetrum striolatum, common darter
 Sympetrum vicinum, autumn meadowhawk or yellow-legged meadowhawk
 Sympetrum vulgatum, vagrant darter

Genus Nannothemis
 Nannothemis bella, elfin skimmer

Genus Pachydiplax
 Pachydiplax longipennis, blue dasher

Genus Erythemis
 Erythemis collocata, western pondhawk
 Erythemis simplicicollis, common pondhawk or eastern pondhawk

Genus Pantala
 Pantala flavescens, wandering glider
 Pantala hymenaea, spot-winged glider

Genus Leucorrhinia

 Leucorrhinia borealis, boreal whiteface
 Leucorrhinia frigida, frosted whiteface
 Leucorrhinia glacialis, crimson-ringed whiteface
 Leucorrhinia hudsonica, Hudsonian whiteface
 Leucorrhinia intacta, dot-tailed whiteface
 Leucorrhinia patricia, Canada whiteface
 Leucorrhinia proxima, belted whiteface

Genus Celithemis
 Celithemis elisa, calico pennant
 Celithemis eponina, Halloween pennant

Genus Perithemis
 Perithemis tenera, Eastern Amberwing

Genus Tramea

 Tramea carolina, Carolina saddlebags
 Tramea lacerata, black saddlebags
 Tramea onusta, red-mantled saddlebags

Family Macromiidae, cruisers

Genus Didymops
 Didymops transversa, stream cruiser

Genus Macromia
 Macromia illinoiensis, Illinois river cruiser or swift river cruiser
 Macromia magnifica, western river cruiser

Family Petaluridae, petaltails

Genus Tanypteryx
Tanypteryx hageni, black petaltail

References

Dunkle, S.W. (2000) Dragonflies through Binoculars: A Field Guide to Dragonflies of North America. New York:Oxford University Press.
Mead, Kurt. (2009) Dragonflies of the North Woods, Second Edition. Duluth, MN:Kollath+Stensaas Publ.

See also
 List of butterflies of Canada
 List of moths of Canada
 List of damselflies of Canada

 Cana
Dragonflies
Can
Dragonflies